Princess Victoria Margaret of Prussia (Victoria Margaret Elizabeth Marie Ulrike; 17 April 1890 – 9 September 1923) was a member of the House of Hohenzollern. She was the eldest daughter of Prince Friedrich Leopold of Prussia and his wife Princess Louise Sophie of Schleswig-Holstein-Sonderburg-Augustenburg. She married Prince Heinrich XXXIII Reuss of Köstritz and had two children.

Biography

Family and lineage
Victoria's paternal grandparents were Prince Friedrich Karl of Prussia and Princess Maria Anna of Anhalt-Dessau. Her maternal grandparents were Frederick VIII, Duke of Schleswig-Holstein and Princess Adelheid of Hohenlohe-Langenburg.

Victoria had three siblings: Prince Friedrich Sigismund of Prussia, Prince Friedrich Karl of Prussia, and Prince Friedrich Leopold of Prussia (1895-1959). Through her mother, Victoria was a niece of Empress Augusta Victoria, wife of Wilhelm II, German Emperor.

Marriage
On 17 May 1913, she married Prince Heinrich XXXIII Reuss of Köstritz, son of Heinrich VII, Prince Reuss of Köstritz and Princess Marie of Saxe-Weimar and Eisenach. By birth, he was member of the House of Reuss, one of the oldest reigning houses in Europe. He was a grandson of Charles Alexander, Grand Duke of Saxe-Weimar-Eisenach and Princess Sophie of the Netherlands. Princess Victoria Margaret was led down the aisle on the arm of her uncle Emperor Wilhelm.

They had two children:

Princess Marie Luise Reuss of Köstritz (9 January 1915 - 17 June 1985) she married Erich Theisen on 7 June 1941 and they were divorced in 1946. They have one daughter. She remarried Dr. Alexander Bodey on 27 March 1954 and they were divorced on 13 January 1956. 
Viktoria Sibylle Theisen (31 December 1942) she married Wolfgang Schafer on 22 September 1969. They have three children:
Anna Katharina Schafer (5 February 1974)
Moritz Fabian Schafer (29 December 1976)
Marie Caroline Schafer (17 January 1979)
 Prince Heinrich II Reuss of Köstritz (24 November 1916 - 24 December 1993)

The marriage was dissolved by divorce in 1922. Princess Victoria Margaret died the following year of complications of influenza. She was buried at Glienicke Palace. Prince Heinrich XXXIII married again to the widowed American 
Allene Tew Burchard in 1929.

Ancestry

References

External links

1890 births
1923 deaths
House of Hohenzollern
Prussian princesses
House of Reuss
People from Potsdam
Princesses of Reuss